Jesús Márquez Rodríguez (born 28 August 1966) is a Puerto Rican politician and the current mayor of Luquillo. Márquez is affiliated with the Popular Democratic Party (PPD) and has served as mayor since 2013. He has a bachelor's degree in political science from the University of Puerto Rico.

References

Living people
Mayors of places in Puerto Rico
Popular Democratic Party (Puerto Rico) politicians
People from Luquillo, Puerto Rico
Puerto Rican Roman Catholics
University of Puerto Rico alumni
1966 births